Gwerz ("ballad", "lament", plural ) is a type of folk song of Brittany. In Breton music, the  tells a story which can be epic, historical, or mythological.  The stories are usually of a tragic nature.  The gwerz is characterised by an often monotonous melody and many couplets, all in the Breton language.  Though historically sung unaccompanied, some modern musicians use limited instrumentation with the gwerz.

Some of the most famous performers in current gwerzioù are Erik Marchand, Yann-Fañch Kemener, and Denez Prigent.

Notable gwerzioù
An hini a garan
Gwerz Skolan
Gwerz Santes Enori
Gwerz Ker is
''Gwerz Fañchig kemper
Gwerz ar vezhinerien
Ar Roue Gralon ha Kear Is

References

Breton music